Sandnes (from Old Norse sandnæs meaning "sandy point") may refer to:

Places

Iceland
Sandnes, Iceland, a village in Vestfirðir region

Greenland
Sandnæs, a farmstead in the "Western Settlement" of medieval Greenland

Norway
Sandnes, a city and municipality in Rogaland county
Sandnes, Bygland, a village in Bygland municipality, Agder county
Sandnes, Risør, a village in Risør municipality, Agder county
Sandnes, Nordland, a village in Hadsel municipality, Nordland county
Sandnes, Finnmark, a village in Sør-Varanger municipality, Troms og Finnmark county
Sandnes, Troms, a village in Gratangen municipality, Troms og Finnmark county
Sandnes, Bjugn, a village in Bjugn municipality, Trøndelag county
Sandnes, Nærøy, a village in Nærøy municipality, Trøndelag county
Sandnes, Vestland, a village in Selje municipality, Vestland county
, a village in Nome municipality, Vestfold og Telemark county
Sandnes Church (Agder), a church in Bygland municipality, Agder county
Sandnes Church (Rogaland), a church in Sandnes municipality, Rogaland county
Sandnes Church (Vestland), a church in Masfjorden municipality, Vestland county
Sandnes Station, a railway station in Sandnes municipality, Rogaland county
Sandnes Sentrum Station, a railway station in Sandnes municipality, Rogaland county
Sandnes Idrettspark, a multi-purpose stadium in Sandnes municipality, Rogaland county
Sandnes Alpine Center, a skiing center located near Sandnes in Sør-Varanger, Troms og Finnmark county

United States
Sandnes Township, Yellow Medicine County, Minnesota, a township in Yellow Medicine county, Minnesota

People
Arne Sandnes (Rogaland) (1925–2006), Norwegian politician for the Conservative Party
Arne Sandnes (Nord-Trøndelag) (1924–2016), Norwegian politician for the Centre Party
Cathrine Sandnes (born 1972), Norwegian martial artist, journalist, and magazine editor
Eystein Sandnes (1927–2006), Norwegian ceramic and glass designer
Stig Ove Sandnes (born 1970), Norwegian sports official

Other
Sandnes FK, a former Norwegian football club from Sandnes, Rogaland, Norway
Sandnes Ulf, a Norwegian football club from Sandnes, Rogaland, Norway
Sandnes Oilers, an American football team based in Sandnes, Rogaland, Norway

See also
Sandness, a district in Shetland